Captain David Reginald Younger, VC (17 March 1871 – 11 July 1900) was a Scottish recipient of the Victoria Cross, the highest and most prestigious award for gallantry in the face of the enemy that can be awarded to British and Commonwealth forces.

Background and early military career
Younger was educated at St Ninian's School, Moffat and Malvern College (1885 – 1890). He was commissioned in 1891 and transferred to the Gordon Highlanders on 23 December 1893. Promoted to lieutenant during the mid 1890s, he left for active service in South Africa following the outbreak of the Second Boer War in October 1899, and was promoted to captain on 14 December 1899.

Details

Younger was 29 years old, and a captain in the 1st Battalion, the Gordon Highlanders, British Army during the Second Boer War when the deed described below took place near Krugersdorp for which he was awarded the Victoria Cross (posthumously) after he died of injuries received during the Battle of Dwarsvlei on 11 July 1900:
The Gordon Highlanders under Major-General Smith-Dorrien were ordered to march from Krugersdorp towards Hekpoot. About 15 km from Krugersdorp they were encountered by a commando under Vecht-Generaal Oosthuizen who opened fire from mountain ridges above the road. The battle was fierce and it was only after dark that the British managed to extricate their guns, wagons and wounded and limped back to Krugersdorp. The engagement was described by Major-General Horace Smith-Dorrien as their 'most trying fight of the whole war'.

His citation in the London Gazette reads:

See also

William Eagleson Gordon was awarded the VC for actions during the same engagement.

John Frederick MacKay who was awarded a VC for actions at Crows Nest Hill on 29 May 1900, was the man who "had dashed out from the safety of the right kopje, hoisted Captain Younger on his back, and carried him behind the left kopje under the concentrated fire of several hundred rifles."

Hugh Montague Trenchard was wounded during an engagement at the same location on 9 October 1900

In the Krugersdorp Cemetery, Captain Younger's headstone stands thirty paces away from the memorial stone to vecht-generaal Sarel Oosthuizen and his younger brother, korporaal Isak Johannes Oosthuizen (who died on 20 April 1902, a few days before the end of the war).

The battle of Dwarsvlei has also been referred to as Leeuhoek, Doornboschfontein and Onrus, all being names of farms in the area that the action took place on that day.

References

Monuments to Courage (David Harvey, 1999)
The Register of the Victoria Cross (This England, 1997)
Scotland's Forgotten Valour (Graham Ross, 1995)
Victoria Crosses of the Anglo-Boer War (Ian Uys, 2000)

External links
 
 Capt David Reginald Younger. The Malvern Register, 1865–1904. 1905. pp 215.
 Northeastmedals.co.uk
 SA Military History 
 The Write Squad 
Angloboerwar.com

Second Boer War recipients of the Victoria Cross
British recipients of the Victoria Cross
Gordon Highlanders officers
British military personnel killed in the Second Boer War
British Army personnel of the Second Boer War
1871 births
1900 deaths
British military personnel of the Chitral Expedition
Military personnel from Edinburgh
British military personnel of the Tirah campaign
People educated at St Ninian's School, Moffat
People educated at Malvern College
British Army recipients of the Victoria Cross